Fujishima may refer to one of the following.

Fujishima, Yamagata, a former Japanese town
Fujishima Station, a Japanese train station
Akira Fujishima, a Japanese chemist
Kōsuke Fujishima, a Japanese manga artist
Fujishima High School, Fukui, Japan
Fujishima Shrine, Fukui, Japan
Retirement name of sumo wrestlers, heads of the Fujishima stable
Akinoumi Setsuo
Musōyama Masashi
Mineko Fujishima, the vocal of the Swinging Popsicle indie pop/rock band from Japan
Fujishima Takeji, a Japanese artist
Tsuneoki Fujishima (1829–1898), Japanese artist
Haruka Fukushima, a shojo manga artist

Japanese-language surnames